Bashkortostan participated in the Turkvision Song Contest 2013 with the song "Kuray Şarkısı", performed by Diana Ishniyazova. The Bashkir entry for the 2013 contest in Eskişehir, Turkey was selected through a national final organised by Bashkir broadcaster Kuray Television (KTV). The national final consisted of seventeen competing acts participating in a televised production where the winner was be determined by 100% votes of jury members made up of music professionals. Ishniyazova failed to qualify from the semi-finals of the contest.

Background

The 2013 contest was Bashkortostan's debut appearance, as it was the inaugural contest. Bashkir broadcaster KTV was the organiser of the Bashkir entry for 2013.

Before Turkvision

National final
Bashkortostan made their debut in the Turkvision Song Contest 2013 festival, in Eskişehir, Turkey. The Bashkir broadcaster Kuray Television organised the entry selection, which took place on 16 November 2013. A total of 17 singers participated in the national selection. The national final was however disrupted due to a fire breaking out at the venue during the show, "The Lights of Ufa" with approximately 1,000 in attendance were evacuated to safety. As a result, the national final was rescheduled to a later date.

The national selection was rescheduled for 5 December 2013, 17 artists participated, with Diana Ishniyazova being selected to represent Bashkortostan.

At Turkvision
However, they failed to qualify to the grand final which took place on 21 December.

References

Turkvision
2013
Countries in the Turkvision Song Contest 2013